The Salt Range is a mountain range in the north of Punjab province of Pakistan, deriving its name from its extensive deposits of rock salt. The range extends along the south of the Potohar Plateau and the north of the Jhelum River. The Salt Range contains the great mines of Khewra, Kalabagh and Warcha which yield vast supplies of salt. Coal of a medium quality is also found.

In the Himalayan and Salt Range, rock containing fossil of marine life go back to the Ediacaran period (up to 570 million years ago), which shows these rocks have developed out of sea sediments, and that where we have the Himalayas now was once a sea.

Sakaser is the highest peak of Salt Range.
Namal Lake, Khabikki Lake and Uchhali Lake are lakes in the Salt Range.

History
An inscription found at Kura in the Salt Range records the building of a Buddhist monastery by a person named Rotta Siddhavriddhi during the reign of the Huna ruler Toramana. The donor expresses the wish that the religious merit gained by his gift be shared by him with the king and his family members.

The Awans, Khokhars, Gakhars, and Janjuas had engaged in an endless battle for sovereignty over the Salt Range.

According to the Emperor Babar, the Jude and the Janjua were "two races descended from the same father, " who from old times had been rulers of the hills between Nilab and Bhera, that is, of the Salt Range. "On one-half of the hill lived the Jud, and on the other half the Janjua." The Awans now occupy western half of these hills towards Nilab and Janjuas (Rajputs) on eastern part of these Hills. Juds are actually a sub-clan of Janjuas and there are still 7 seven villages of Juds near Dhrabi Area of Chakwal including Dhrabi village and Dam. They are descendants of Raja Jodh who was 2nd Prince of Janjua King Raja Mal Dev Khan Janjua. There are several forts on these hills and all of them were built by Janjua Rajputs and their ancestors the Pandav's at Katas Raj as well as the Janjua Shahi Dynasty of 2nd Kabul Shahis at Nandna fort.
Also this area is known as the first ever Muslim Rajputs Kingdom and Raja Mal Dev Khan Janjua was the founder of This Kingdom. He was from Chandravanshi Rajputs clan and he was from the bloodline of famous Indian Mahabharata Warrior Prince Arjun Dev Pandav.

About 1500 Janjua Rajputs warrior cavalry fought in the battle of Panipat from this area in support of Babur under the command Malik Hast Khan Janjua (Asad). 
Sultan Lashkar Janjua and Raja Sanghral Ali Khan Janjuas were also commanding their own Muslim Janjua Rajputs during Battle of Panipat and Battle of Khanwa against Rana Sanga. All of them were rulers of these Hills and chieftains of this ruling Rajput clan. Before these hills were known as Koh-e-jodh, it was on the name of Raja Jodh Janjua son of Raja Mal Dev Khan Janjua.

Kathwai
Two interesting sites are close to Kathwai, Kutte Mar, and Tulaja fort. At Kuttee Mar to the Northeast of Kathwai are Muslim graves made of Kangar and the purported grave of a dog that is said to have died defending the wedding procession of its owner from an attack by bandits. Kutte Mar may have been the place where the Khura inscription of Toramana was found (Buhler 1891–92, 238–41; Sircar 1965: 422–4). If this assessment is correct, a Buddhist monastery was established here around 500. A.D. This inscription and another fragmentary inscription found at Sakaser (Pakistan Archaeology 5, 1968: 284-70) confirm that this area was a flourishing, center for Buddhism, which is borne out by the extensive archaeological remains.
 
The Tulaja fort is located on a huge rock outcropping with sheer cliffs overlooking the shrine of Kacchianwalla and the Punjab plains. The entire area is covered with the ruins of defensive walls, houses, and other structures made of large stone blocks. Although one building has been identified as a mosque, it is very difficult to distinguish other religious, military or civil structures. One of the most interesting features is a large square tank made of the flat rectangular bricks, which may have supplied water so that the fort could withstand a siege. Comparing this tank with those in other forts may help in assigning a relative date to its construction. In addition to architectural styles, evidence from any coins, which are found here, may help to indicate if this city belonged to the period of the Turk Sultans, Lodhis or Mughals. Extensive remains of a cemetery and other settlements are on the slopes below the fort. There are also supposed to be some remains on Tulaji across the valley from Talaja.

Habitat
The Salt Range has a high level of biodiversity and is home to a number of wildlife sanctuaries (ChumbiSurla, Jahlar Lake, Sodhi, Khabekki Lake and KundalRakh) and protected areas, including the Chinji National Park and several forest (e.g. Simli Reserved Forest and Noorpur Reserved Forest) and wetland areas (including Ucchali, Jahlar and Khabbiki lakes).

See also
 Himalayan salt
 Khewra Salt Mine
 List of mountains in Pakistan

References

The Salt Range: Pakistan's unique field museum of geology and paleontology

External links
 Salt Range Temples

Geography of Punjab, Pakistan
History of Punjab
History of Punjab, Pakistan
Mountain ranges of Punjab (Pakistan)
Regions of Punjab, Pakistan
Salt industry in Pakistan